Billy Blade and the Temple of Time is an  Action-adventure video game developed by Nerlaska Studio and published by Iridon Interactive, released in March 25, 2005 for PC.

Plot
Billy Blade is a young explorer and swordsman with a blue monkey companion named Kong. Using a map, he discovers the legendary Temple of Time. Inside, he discovers the Time Crystal, but as he tries to take it, it flies out of his hands and sucks Kong inside. To free him, Billy Blade must travel back to three different locations: the Ice Age, Persia and the Caribbean and defeat the Guardians there. After freeing Kong, the temple collapses as Billy and Kong escape.

Gameplay
Billy Blade and the Temple of Time is a 3D Action-Adventure game. Billy can jump and double jump, kick open crates and chests and slash enemies with his swords. Billy can also find a Fireblade that allows him to shoot fireballs at enemies, and a Blueblade that allows him to attack faster.

Reception

PC Zone criticized Billy Blade and the Temple of Time's camera, "almost non-existent" AI, "infuriating" platforming, and "clumsy" combat.

References

External links

2005 video games
Action-adventure games
Fantasy video games
Legendo Entertainment games
Video games about time travel
Video games developed in Spain
Video games set in the Caribbean
Video games set in Iran
Video games set in prehistory
Windows games
Single-player video games